Litvinovskiye Khutora is a rural locality (a village) in Kolchugino, Kolchuginsky District, Vladimir Oblast, Russia. The population was 8 as of 2010.

Geography 
Litvinovskiye Khutora is located 6 km east of Kolchugino (the district's administrative centre) by road. Litvinovo is the nearest rural locality.

References 

Rural localities in Kolchuginsky District